Samsung Galaxy F13 is a mid-range smartphone manufactured by Samsung Electronics. It is part of Samsung Galaxy F series. This phone was announced on 22 June 2022.

On 22 June 2022, Samsung launched Galaxy F13 in India with an Auto Data Switching feature.

References 

Android (operating system) devices
Samsung Galaxy
Mobile phones introduced in 2022